The Anabaptist riot of Amsterdam or Wederdopersoproer generally refers to an event on 10 May 1535 in which 40 Anabaptists occupied the city hall. The city guardsmen stormed the city hall and in the battle that ensued, the mayor Peter Colijn, 20 militiamen and 28 Anabaptists were killed. The surviving Anabaptists were executed in a particularly gruesome manner: their hearts were cut out of their breasts while still alive, their bodies were drawn and quartered, and their heads were stuck on pikes and posted at the city gates. The event was commemorated in a painting by Barend Dircksz.

References

1530s in the Habsburg Netherlands
1535 in the Habsburg Netherlands
History of Anabaptists
Dutch Anabaptists
16th-century Anabaptists